Kohima is the capital city of Nagaland.

Kohima may also refer to:

Kohima District, its namesake district
Kohima Town (Vidhan Sabha constituency), a legislative assembly constituency of Nagaland
Kohima Village, a village located in the northeastern part of the present day Kohima Urban Area
Municipal Wards of Kohima, 19 wards that cover the urban portion of Kohima

See also